Wang Zhixuan (born 30 June 1991), also known as Vanessa Wang, is a Chinese actress and model. Wang graduated from Qiqihar University.

Career

Beginnings
In 2010, at the age of 19, Wang was discovered after being photographed while she was taking an art examination which led to her being dubbed "Little Kelly Chen" by netizens. In 2011, she made her modelling debut as a CVTV star angel and was chosen to promote the Volvo Ocean Race in China for two consecutive years (2011–2012).

Between 2011 and 2013, Wang made appearances in multiple Chinese variety shows including as a contestant on Super Star Ding Dong (开门大吉).

2013–present: Rising popularity
In 2013, Wang made her official acting debut in China's first 3D fantasy romance movie The Fox Lover. The same year, she appeared in the urban sitcom Happy Leftovers.

In 2014, Wang appeared in the campus comedy Super Teacher Bing adapted from the online novel of the same name, playing a bold, unrestrained, charming and innocent "beautiful bad girl". The drama garnered over 100 million views online during its broadcast period. The same year, Wang also appeared in the female critical ethics drama Youth Confession produced by Hunan TV and LeTV.

In 2015, Wang appeared in the Zanilia Zhao and Ryan Zheng-led workplace drama Best Get Going as the intern Gao Ruohan. The same year, she appeared in the idol drama My Love to Tell You. In September, Wang was cast alongside Elvis Han and Gülnezer Bextiyar in the fantasy romance television series Chinese Paladin 5, adapted from the popular role-playing game The Legend of Sword and Fairy 5 as the demoness Du Ying. The same year, she played the role of the ninth princess consort in the period romance drama Legend of Nine Tailed Fox.

In 2016, Wang played in the period romance drama Royal Highness which aired in 2018. In November, she was a guest at the inaugural OK!Funshion Week Celebrity Fashion Week. She then appeared in the anti-Japanese war drama The Battle of Jiangqiao portraying a Jiangmen-born patriotic and progressive young lady.

In 2017, Wang played a supporting role alongside Xia Yu, Yan Ni and Binlong Pan in the urban fantasy comedy movie Wished.

In 2019, Wang appeared in the youth cute pet emotional drama Hero Dog 3 alongside Jiang Chao and Cecilia Boey as a gentle female vet. In July, Wang appeared in the fashion drama The Next Top Star which starred Qu Ying and Xu Kaicheng as cold-looking Guan Tang who has a sense of justice.

Filmography

Film

Television series

Short film

References

External links

 Zhixuan Wang on Internet Movie Database

1991 births
Living people
People from Daxing'anling
Chinese film actresses
Chinese television actresses
21st-century Chinese actresses
Actresses from Heilongjiang